Mendel University in Brno is located in Brno, Czech Republic. It was founded on 24 July 1919 on the basis of the former Tábor Academy. It now consists of five faculties and one institute - the Faculty of AgriSciences, Faculty of Forestry and Wood Technology, Faculty of Business and Economics, Faculty of Horticulture, Faculty of Regional Development and International Studies and Institute of Lifelong Education. It is named since 1994 after Gregor Mendel, the botanist and "father of genetics", who was active in this city during his lifetime.

In June 2020, the university was included in the QS World University Rankings top 1,000 for the first time, placed #701-750.

Faculties
Faculty of AgriSciences
Department of Plant Biology
Department of Applied and Landscape Ecology
Department of Agrosystems and Bioclimatology
Department of Crop Science, Plant Breeding and Plant Medicine
Department of Agrochemistry, Soil Science, Microbiology and Plant Nutrition
Department of Animal Nutrition and Forage Production
Department of Animal Morphology, Physiology and Genetics
Department of Zoology, Fisheries, Hydrobiology and Apiculture
Department of Molecular Biology and Radiobiology
Department of Agriculture, Food and Environmental Engineering
Department of Engineering and Automobile Transport
Department of Food Technology
Department of Animal Breeding
Department of Chemistry and Biochemistry
Department of Physical Training
Faculty of Forestry and Wood Technology
Department of Forest Management and Applied Geoinformatics
Department of Geology and Pedology
Department of Mathematics
Department of Forest Botany, Dendrology and Geobiocoenology
Department of Forest and Wood Products Economics and Policy
Department of Landscape Management
Department of Forest and Forest Products Technology
Department of Forest Protection and Wildlife Management
Department of Silviculture
Department of Wood Processing
Department of Furniture, Design and Habitat 
Department of Wood Science
Institute of Forest Ecology
Faculty of Business and Economics
Department of Economics
Department of Business Economics
Department of Management
Department of Statistics and Operational Analysis
Department of Accounting and Taxation
Department of Marketing and Trade
Department of Informatics
Department of Law
Department of Finance
Department of Social Sciences
Faculty of Horticulture in Lednice
Department of Fruit Growing
Department of Horticultural Machinery
Department of Vegetable Growing and Floriculture
Department of Breeding and Propagation of Horticultural Plants
Department of Post-harvest Technology of Horticultural Products
Department of Viticulture and Viniculture
Department of Garden and Landscape Architecture
Department of Planting Design and Maintenance
Department of Landscape Planning
The Mendeleum - Institute of Genetics and Plant Breeding
Institute of Lifelong Learning 
Faculty of Regional Development and International Studies

Bachelor programs of the Faculty of Regional Development and International Studies
 Regional Development (in Czech)
 Regional Development (in English, study is paid)
 International Territorial Studies (in Czech)
 International Territorial Studies (in English study is paid)

Master programs of the Faculty of Regional Development and International Studies 
 Regional Development (in Czech)
 Regional Development (in English, study is paid)
 International Territorial Studies (in Czech)
 International Territorial Studies (in English study is paid)

References

External links

 Official site
 http://is.mendelu.cz

 
Universities in the Czech Republic
Agriculture in the Czech Republic
Forestry education
Educational institutions established in 1919
Education in Brno
Organizations based in Brno
Buildings and structures in Brno
University Brno
Agricultural universities and colleges in the Czech Republic
1919 establishments in Czechoslovakia